Richard More was an English cricketer and colonial administrator.

Richard More may also refer to:

Richard More (fl.1402), probably Richard More, MP for Plympton Erle in 1402
Richard More (died 1595), MP for Grantham and Plympton Erle
Richard More (died 1635), MP
Richard More (died 1698), MP for Bishop's Castle
Richard More (Parliamentarian) (1576–1643), English landowner and politician
Richard More (Mayflower passenger) (1614–c. 1694/96)
Richard More (Archdeacon of Exeter) (fl. 1505–1515)

See also
Richard de la More, medieval clergyman
Richard Moore (disambiguation)